"Don't Panic" is a song by American hip hop recording artist French Montana. It was released on August 12, 2014, as a standalone single. The song was produced by DJ Mustard.

Background
The song was teased for months on social media and featured a different cover art prior to its official release in August. Then girlfriend Khloé Kardashian is featured on the right side of the official cover art.  The song makes a few allusions to the novel The Hitchhiker's Guide to the Galaxy, namely the phrase "Don't Panic", repeated throughout the song, and star and planet imagery in the first verse.

Music video
A music video for the song directed by Eif Rivera was shot on July 9, 2014. It was released on August 13, 2014. The video features Montana's now ex-girlfriend Khloé Kardashian.

Remixes
The official remix features R&B singers Jeremih and Chris Brown. Fellow Coke Boy member Chinx released his own remix to the song. Compton rapper YG made a remix of his own.

Track listing
Digital download

Charts

References

2014 songs
2014 singles
French Montana songs
Song recordings produced by Mustard (record producer)
Songs written by French Montana
Songs written by Mustard (record producer)